HMM Copenhagen is a large container ship built in 2020 by Daewoo Shipbuilding & Marine Engineering in South Korea. The ship has a capacity of 23,964 TEU. HMM Copenhagen is registered in Panama and operated by HMM Co Ltd.

References

Container ships
2020 ships